Daviesia newbeyi is a species of flowering plant in the family Fabaceae and is endemic to the south-west of Western Australia. It is a bushy, broom-like, more or less glabrous shrub with ridged stems, narrowly oblong to linear phyllodes, and orange flowers with dark red markings.

Description

Taxonomy and naming
Daviesia newbeyi was first formally described in 1991 by Michael Crisp in Australian Systematic Botany from specimens collected by Kenneth Newbey near Ravensthorpe in 1978. The specific epithet (newbeyi) honours the collector of the type specimens.

Distribution and habitat
This daviesia grows in heath and is known from a few disjunct populations, near Ravensthorpe, Lake Grace, Coolgardie and Esperance, in the Esperance Plains and Mallee biogeographic region of inland Western Australia.

Conservation status
Daviesia newbeyi is listed as "Priority Three" by the Government of Western Australia Department of Biodiversity, Conservation and Attractions, meaning that it is poorly known and known from only a few locations but is not under imminent threat.

References

newbeyi
Eudicots of Western Australia
Plants described in 1991
Taxa named by Michael Crisp